The women's high jump at the 2010 World Junior Championships in Athletics was held at the Moncton 2010 Stadium on 23 & 25 July.

Medalists

Records
Prior to the competition, the existing world junior and championship records were as follows.

Results

Final
25 July

Qualifications
23 July

Qualification standard 1.83 m or at least best 12 qualified.

Group A

Group B

Participation
According to an unofficial count, 30 athletes from 23 countries participated in the event.

References

High jump
High jump at the World Athletics U20 Championships
2010 in women's athletics